Pleasant Hill is a neighborhood located in Ward 5 of Northeast Washington, D.C. Pleasant Hill is contained between Allison Street NE and Bates Road NE to the north, Taylor Street NE to the south, the Washington Metropolitan Area Red Line tracks to the east, and North Capitol Street NW to the west. Pleasant Hill borders the adjacent neighborhoods of Fort Totten (north), North Michigan Park (northeast), Michigan Park (east), University Heights (south), Petworth (west), Brightwood Park (northwest), and Park View (southwest). It is adjacent to the Catholic University of America and even houses its athletic facilities. Pleasant Hill houses the Catholic University of America's soccer and football fields as well as its Raymond A. DuFour Athletic Center.

Pleasant Hill also borders the Fort Totten Park and Fort Totten Waste Disposal Facility on its northern end. Pleasant Hill also features direct access to the Washington Metropolitan Branch Red Line trail as well. The Pleasant Hill neighborhood is also located within very close proximity to Providence Hospital in the adjacent Michigan Park neighborhood, as well as the Armed Soldiers Retirement Home, Washington D.C. Veterans Affairs Medical Center, MedStar Washington Hospital Center, and Children's National Main Hospital in the adjacent Park View neighborhood. In terms of educational institutions and academies, the Pleasant Hill neighborhood houses the Washington Yu Ying Charter School and the Kirov Academy of Ballet of Washington D.C. Residents of the Pleasant Hill neighborhood also have convenient access to the Archbishop Carroll Catholic High School in the adjacent University Heights neighborhood.

In terms of housing, Pleasant Hill generally features medium-sized brick homes constructed between the 1930s to the 1950s and contains several apartment complex, which notably are the Hawaiian Gardens apartments, Clemont Apartments, Pleasant Hills Village Apartments, and Brookland Ridge Apartments. In terms of commerce, the Pleasant Hill contains the Heights Shopping center strip mall, which consists of a Subway Sandwich Fast Food Restaurant, 7- Eleven Convenience Store, University Wine & Spirits Liquor Store, Changing Faces Barbershop & Salon, Heights Seafood Shop,  Sicilian Pizza parlor, and DSI Financial Planning Shop.

In terms of transportation, residents of the Pleasant Hill neighborhood have access to a Metrorail stations at Fort Totten, Brookland-CUA, and Georgia Avenue - Petworth Metro Stations. In addition to these three Metro Station, residents of Pleasant Hill also have access to Metrobus Service as well.

Neighborhoods in Northeast (Washington, D.C.)